Flykeen Airways was a regional airline based in Blackpool, United Kingdom. It operated charter as well as scheduled services from its main base at Blackpool International Airport.

Code data 
ICAO Code: JFK
Callsign: KEENAIR

History 
The company was established in 1968 as Keenair Charter and started scheduled passenger operations in 1990. It started services on the Blackpool, Isle of Man, Belfast City route in 2002. It was wholly owned by Peter Whitehead. In 2005 its ownership changed and the name was renamed to A2B Airways.

Destinations
 Belfast City to Blackpool and Isle of Man
 Blackpool to Belfast City and Isle of Man
 Isle of Man to Belfast City and Blackpool

All services were operated by Aerocondor using a Shorts 360 aircraft (at June 2005).

Fleet 
The Flykeen Airways fleet consisted of 2 Embraer EMB 110P1 Bandeirante aircraft (at January 2005).

See also
 List of defunct airlines of the United Kingdom

References

External links
Flykeen Airways

Defunct airlines of the United Kingdom
Companies based in Blackpool
History of Blackpool
Airlines established in 1968
Airlines disestablished in 2005
1968 establishments in the United Kingdom